The .300 Winchester Magnum (also known as .300 Win Mag or .300 WM) (7.62×67mmB, 7.62x66BR) is a belted, bottlenecked magnum rifle cartridge that was introduced by the Winchester Repeating Arms Company in 1963. The .300 Winchester Magnum is a magnum cartridge designed to fit in a standard rifle action. It is based on the .375 H&H Magnum, which has been blown out, shortened, and necked down to accept a .30 caliber (7.62 mm) bullet.

The .300 Win Mag is extremely versatile and has been adopted by a wide range of users including big game hunters, target shooters, military units, and law enforcement departments. 

Many hunters have found the cartridge to be an effective all-around choice with bullet options ranging from the flatter shooting 150 grain to the harder-hitting 200+ grain selections available in factory ammunition.  The .300 Win Mag remains the most popular .30 caliber magnum with American hunters, despite being surpassed in performance by the more powerful .300 and .30-378 Weatherby Magnums and the newer .300 Remington Ultra Magnum, .300 Norma Magnum, .30 Nosler, and .300 PRC. It is a popular selection for hunting moose, elk, and bighorn sheep as it can deliver better long-range performance with heavier bullet weights than many other .30 caliber cartridges. Military and law enforcement departments adopted the cartridge for long-range use, particularly by snipers. As a testament to its accuracy, following its introduction, it went on to win several  competitions.

Cartridge history

Prior to the advent of the .300 Winchester Magnum there were already a number of .30 caliber (7.62 mm) cartridges billed as offering a “magnum” level of performance. Such rounds included the .30 Newton of 1913 and the .300 H&H Magnum of 1925. The .30 Newton saw limited commercial success, however, and the .300 H&H was too long for the standard length Mauser and Springfield rifle actions of the time, barring substantial modifications.

Beginning with the .270 Weatherby Magnum in 1943, Roy Weatherby introduced a popular line of rifle cartridges based on the H&H case shortened to fit a standard length action. The Weatherby cartridges of any given caliber followed a formula of “improved” design, which entailed “blowing out” the H&H Magnum parent case, thereby reducing case taper and increasing usable powder capacity. The .300 Weatherby Magnum, an “improved,” full-length cartridge derived from the .300 H&H was introduced in 1944.

The larger manufacturers soon noticed Weatherby's standard length magnum case, and in due time followed suit. From 1956-1959, Winchester introduced three such cartridges: the .264 Winchester Magnum, .338 Winchester Magnum and .458 Winchester Magnum, all based on the shortened and blown out .375 H&H Magnum case. The popular .30 caliber's omission from that lineup prompted a response by the shooting community and Winchester’s competition. Wildcatters soon produced the .30-338 Winchester Magnum and Norma Projektilfabrik, who were by now manufacturing ammunition for Weatherby, took the standard length basic Weatherby brass and necked it down to .30 caliber (7.62 mm) to form the .308 Norma Magnum.

The .300 Winchester Magnum was introduced in 1963 by Winchester for use in the Model 70 rifle. This resulted in a cartridge with a neck somewhat shorter than the diameter of the bullet. Some gun writers have speculated that, had the cartridge been released earlier, its dimensions would have more closely matched the .30-338 Winchester Magnum wildcat cartridge.

The .300 Winchester Magnum was not an instant success, mainly due to competition from the comparable 7mm Remington Magnum cartridge introduced in 1962. However, interest among hunters and shooters grew with time, and it gradually became the most popular of the magnum cartridges.

The .300 Winchester Magnum's broad availability in popular rifles such as the Winchester Model 70, Ruger M77, Remington Model 700 and Weatherby Mark  V, together with the wide availability of ammunition from a number of manufacturers, made the cartridge a popular choice among hunters and competitive shooters the world over. Although the .300 H&H Magnum, .300 Weatherby Magnum, .30-338 Winchester Magnum, and the .308 Norma Magnum had a head start on the .300 Win Mag, most of these cartridges eventually faded into obscurity. Only the .300 Win Mag and the .300 Weatherby Mag survived into the 21st century as readily available cartridges, with the Winchester round by far the more popular of the two. New .30 caliber magnums have since been introduced, including the .300 Winchester Short Magnum, .300 Remington Ultra Magnum, .30 Nosler, and 300 PRC; however, none of these have achieved the popularity that the .300 Win Mag retains.

Design and specifications
The .300 Winchester Magnum uses the same case head design of the .375 H&H Magnum, its parent cartridge, though the taper of the round has been significantly reduced in order to ensure greater case volume. The larger dimensions of the .300 Win Mag compared to the .308 Norma Magnum and .30-338 Winchester Magnum cartridges ensures that rifles chambered in such rounds can readily be rechambered to the .300 Win Mag, though the shorter neck of the longer round necessitates comparable bullets must be seated more deeply in the case.

Cartridge dimensions
The ammunition standards organizations SAAMI (Sporting Arms and Ammunition Manufacturers' Institute) and C.I.P. (Commission Internationale Permanente pour l'Epreuve des Armes à Feu Portatives) have provided specifications for the .300 Winchester Magnum cartridge. Almost no divergence between C.I.P. and SAAMI dimensional values exist for this cartridge.
However, case volume varies from manufacturer to manufacturer to such an extent that the reloading software suite QuickLOAD provides five differing cartridge case capacities for the cartridge.
The SAAMI specification .300 Winchester Magnum case capacity is  91.5 grains of H2O (5.93 ml).
According to QuickLoad, the case capacities of .300 Win Mag brass produced by four ammunition manufacturers measure as follows:
Remington 88.0 grains of H2O (5.70 ml)
Federal 92.0 grains of H2O (5.96 ml)
Winchester 93.8 grains of H2O (6.08 ml)
Norma 95.5 grains of H2O (6.19 ml)

.300 Winchester Magnum SAAMI cartridge dimensions. All sizes in inches (in) and millimeters (mm). The projectile diameter should be 0.309 in (7.85 mm) 

Recommended twist ratio is 1:10 (254 mm).
C.I.P. defines the common rifling twist rate for this cartridge as 254 mm (1 in 10 in), 6 grooves, Ø lands = , Ø grooves = , land width = , and the primer type is large rifle magnum.

The SAAMI Maximum Average Pressure (MAP) for this cartridge is  piezo pressure (54,000 CUP).
According to the official C.I.P. (Commission Internationale Permanente pour l'Epreuve des Armes à Feu Portatives) rulings the .300 Winchester Magnum can handle up to  Pmax piezo pressure. In C.I.P. regulated countries every rifle cartridge combo has to be proofed at 125% of this maximum C.I.P. pressure to certify for sale to consumers. This means that .300 Winchester Magnum chambered arms in C.I.P. regulated countries are currently (2013) proof tested at  PE piezo pressure.

Performance 

Capable of stabilizing bullets weights ranging from 110 to 220 grains, the .300 Winchester Magnum happens to be a very versatile cartridge for different purposes and conditions including big game hunting, bench rest shooting and military applications. 

150-grain bullets 
Although the 150 grain bullet may have a lower ballistic coefficient than heavier alternatives, this is compensated by its high velocities which extend its maximum point blank range to considerable distances making it suitable for light skinned big game such as deer and sheep, up to considerable distances. The ability to zero the .300 Winchester Magnum and shoot without hold over to  makes the cartridge one of the flatter shooting cartridges.

165-grain bullets 
The 165 grain bullet provides a higher ballistic coefficient than similarly shaped 150 grain bullet while maintaining a very high velocity which is translated into a flatter trajectory. Usually a 165 grain bullet shot from a .300 Win Mag has a muzzle velocity of approximately 3160 fps, which is 100 to 150 fps slower than the lighter 150 grain bullet. A almost similar 168 grain bullet is also popular among the .300 win mag as well as other .30 cal. magnum cartridges.

180-grain bullets 
Probably the most popular weight for the 300 Win Mag is the 180 grain bullet, with high ballistic coefficient and capable of taking down light skinned big game of any weight. The 180 and 185 grain bullets are also considered the most versatile, with a muzzle velocity of 2950 fps from average factory loads.

190 to 220-grain bullets 
Due to its high ballistic coefficients, the heavier bullets are usually preferred by long range shooters being extremely efficient in bucking wind as well as carrying downrange energy capable take down game of any size in America and Europe. These bullets are generally loaded to reach muzzle velocities of 2700 to 2800 fps.

Comparison with other .30 Caliber Big Game Cartridges 

Compared with the 30-06 Springfield the .300 Winchester Magnum provides a roughly  increase in velocity. This translates to about 20% greater energy advantage over the 30-06 Springfield cartridge. As the bullet will take up volume which could have been taken by the propellant velocity advantages diminish as the weight of the bullet increases.

While in hunting situations such accuracy is unnecessary, such accuracy does aid in the extending the range of the cartridge. Taken together with its performance it remains one of the most useful and popular cartridges today.

Although cartridges such as the .30-378 Weatherby Magnum, .300 Remington Ultra Magnum and the .300 Weatherby Magnum all exceed performance of the .300 Winchester Magnum none of these cartridges can be chambered in a standard length action. Few .30 caliber (7.62 mm) standard length cartridges can match the performance and versatility of the .300 Winchester Magnum.

The down side to this performance is recoil. The amount of recoil the cartridge generates is a step up from the non-magnum .30 caliber (7.62 mm) cartridges. Its recoil is about 30% greater than that of the .30-06 Springfield, which is known as a 'stout' cartridge. With the average load for the .300 Winchester Magnum, the recoil energy is roughly 30 ft lbs. This would put the .300 Winchester Magnum at the upper limit of what most shooters can shoot comfortably for extended shooting sessions. As a rough comparison, the recoil of the .300 Winchester Magnum is roughly comparable to a 12 gauge shotgun shooting 1 oz. slugs. This greater recoil can make the .300 Winchester Magnum, despite its inherent accuracy advantages, a harder cartridge to shoot accurately, when compared to non-magnum .30 caliber cartridges such as the .30-06 Springfield or the .308 Winchester. On the other hand, recoil is subjective (some are more sensitive to it than others) and one can get used to it with practice. Also, many rifles available today now have effective recoil attenuating features built into them, such as muzzle compensators and energy absorbing stocks and butt-pads, that can significantly lessen recoil as it is felt by the shooter.

Recoil from the .300 Win Mag is noticeably higher than the well-known and popular .30-06 Springfield. Subsequently, Remington has made low-recoil rounds called "Managed-Recoil" available for the .300 Win Mag, which recoil less while providing performance similar to the .30-06 Springfield.

Hunting Application 

The .300 Winchester Magnum is powerful enough to hunt any North American game animal and is commercially loaded with bullets ranging from 150 grain to 220 grain bullets, making it a very versatile cartridge for hunting big game of all weighs and under all conditions. 

“If you need to shoot long or short, big or small, if the house was burning down and you could only save one, I’d make it the 300 win mag”  

It is particularly useful when hunting the members of the ungulate family such as sheep, deer, elk, and moose; being popular cartridge among hunters for these class 3 game species. Controlled expansion bullets such as the Nosler Partition or Barnes X are preferred rather than more lightly constructed bullets for these larger species of ungulate. Bullets weighing  are adequate for smaller deer such as the mule deer and white-tailed deer.

.150-grain bullets are generally used for hunting medium sized game species. Factory loads are usually loaded to leave the muzzle at 3,250 feet per second, offering the hunter a very flat bullet suitable for long range shots. 165 and 168-grain bullets also give a flat trajectory with higher ballistic coefficients, which hold on better in cross winds, which makes them a fine alternative for hunting mountain game. But probably the most popular bullet weigh is the 180-grain, offering a good balance between flat trajectory, ballistic coefficient and energy to emphatically hunt large-size big game animals such as elk and moose up to considerable distances.

"So, while the .300 Winchester Magnum does very well with standard .30-caliber hunting bullets from 150 to 180 grains, it starts to lose ground with extra-heavy bullets of 200 grains and more"

With its velocity, low bullet drop and high energy retention, the .300 Winchester Magnum is useful for hunting sheep and other mountain game species, even at extended range, which may be considered unethical for many sport hunters.

The .300 Winchester Magnum cartridge is also very effective on dangerous class 3 game such as bear. Both black bears and grizzly bears are hunted using the cartridge. Many consider the .300 Winchester Magnum to be on the lighter side of what is required for the largest bears, but loaded with heavier bullets, hunters have had success with the cartridge against these large bears.

The .300 Winchester Magnum is well-suited for 95% of the world's game. Due to its worldwide ability and ballistic capability to shoot flat and carry its energy efficiently, due to its high sectional densities and ballistic coefficients, the cartridge is one of the more favored rounds for African plains game as well as big game hunting for different species and hunting conditions globally. With heavier bullets boasting high sectional density and ballistic coefficients the cartridge possesses the long range performance necessary to take large game species at extended ranges. Due to the wide selection of bullet weights and construction, the .300 Winchester Magnum may be used to hunt effectively everything from the dik-dik to the giant eland, being an excellent cartridge choice for all plains game under . However, it is also an excelent cartridge for mountain hunting conditions such as found in the Asian Mountains, Rockies and Andes, where fast bullets carrying enough energy to sit game fast while being able to buck cross winds efficiently are praised.

Military and law enforcement applications

The .300 Win Mag sees use in long-range benchrest shooting competitions and has been adopted by law enforcement marksmen and by a few specific branches of the U.S. Military for use by snipers. Maximum effective range is generally accepted to be  with ammunition incorporating low-drag projectiles.

The U.S. government purchased MK 248 MOD 1 .300 Winchester Magnum match-grade ammunition in 2009 for use in adapted M24 Sniper Weapon Systems and other .300 Winchester Magnum sniper rifles like the U.S. Navy Mk.13s. This ammunition was developed as a .300 Winchester Magnum Match Product Improvement (PIP) and uses the 220 gr (14.26 g) Sierra MatchKing Hollow Point Boat Tail (HPBT) very-low-drag bullet fired at a nominal muzzle velocity of 2,850 ft/s plus or minus 50 ft/s (869 m/s ± 15.2 m/s). According to the U.S. Navy this ammunition should increase the maximum effective range of .300 Winchester Magnum sniper rifle systems to 1,500 yards (1,370 m), decrease wind deflection on bullets in flight and use Hodgdon H1000, a reduced muzzle flash propellant that remains temperature stable across an operational temperature range of −25 °F to +165 °F (−32 °C to 74 °C). However, the handloader can take advantage of modern advances in powder technology and actually exceed the velocity of the MK 248 MOD 1 cartridge while still loading to maximum SAAMI cartridge overall length, and maintaining safe pressure.

According to JBM Ballistics, using the 0.310 G7 ballistic coefficient provided by Bryan Litz, and a Weapon Employment Zone (WEZ) analysis of the XM2010 rifle with various .300 Winchester Magnum ammunition types by Bryan Litz, the MK 248 MOD 1 .300 Winchester Magnum cartridge, when fired at its nominal muzzle velocity of 869 m/s (2,850 ft/s), should have  supersonic range under International Standard Atmosphere conditions at sea level (air density ρ = 1.225 kg/m3).

In January 2014, the U.S. Department of Defense annual testing report found that the older A191 or MK 248 Mod 0 .300 Winchester Magnum service round loaded with aerodynamically less efficient 190 gr (12.32 g) Sierra MatchKing Hollow Point Boat Tail (HPBT) bullets (0.270 G7 ballistic coefficient provided by Bryan Litz) fired from the XM2010 demonstrated adequate performance and lethality. Live fire tests were conducted in March 2013 against ballistics gelatin, light material barriers, and other targets to determine the projectile's ability to perforate targets.

Several companies, among them HS precision, Kimber and Remington manufacture rifles chambered for the .300 Winchester Magnum specifically targeted at law enforcement agencies. The Chattanooga Police Department and Minot Police Department S.W.A.T units and the L.A. County Sheriffs Department's Special Enforcement Bureau which have adopted the .300 Winchester Magnum in some capacity. Due to the power and performance of the .300 Winchester Magnum cartridge the cartridge is more likely to be employed by specialist units within a police department rather than as a general service weapon issued to law enforcement agents.

Military and law enforcement firearms

 : Sako TRG-42
 : Bundeswehr G22
 : Accuracy International AWM (Such as Mk 13 rifle)
 : Mk. 13 Sniper Weapon System
 : M2010 Enhanced Sniper Rifle
 : M86 sniper rifle
 : Armalite Model AR-30
 : Remington Model 700 Police Long Action tactical rifle
 : Savage Model 110BA
 : Weatherby TRR Threat Response Rifle

Criticism 
The .300 Winchester Magnum was designed with a neck which is shorter than the diameter of its bullet. If Winchester had released the cartridge prior to 1960, the cartridge would have been similar to the .30-338 Winchester wildcat cartridge. However, by the time Winchester got around to designing their own .300, the .308 Norma Magnum and the .30-338 were already on the scene. To help differentiate it from the other .300 magnums, and to allow for the chambers of the standard length .300 magnums to be rebored to the .300 Winchester Magnum chamber dimensions, Winchester moved the shoulder forward and lengthened the cartridge slightly. This created the much criticized short neck of the .300 Winchester Magnum.

The short neck was thought to hinder accuracy because it would prevent the alignment of cartridge to the bore, but this is rarely an issue either today or when the cartridge was designed. The fact that the cartridge has gone to win many  matches suggests that such a concern is unfounded.

See also
 7 mm caliber
 .30-06 Springfield
 .300 Winchester Short Magnum
 List of crew-served weapons of the U.S. Armed Forces
 List of rifle cartridges
 Table of handgun and rifle cartridges
 Sectional density

References

External links 
 300 Winchester Magnum: How Does Barrel Length Change Velocity- A 16″ 300 Win Mag?

Magnum rifle cartridges
Pistol and rifle cartridges
Winchester Magnum rifle cartridges
Military cartridges